Ivoclar Vivadent AG is a worldwide dental company that produces a range of products and systems for dentists and dental technicians.

Basics 
Headquartered in Schaan, Liechtenstein, Ivoclar Vivadent AG has been a privately owned company since it was founded in Zurich in 1923. The company's products are shipped from Schaan to 130 countries worldwide. Ivoclar Vivadent does business in all dental markets worldwide. It has subsidiaries and marketing offices in 30 countries, and employs approximately 3600 people.

Products 
Ivoclar Vivadent operates in the four product areas: Digital dentistry, Direct Restoratives, Fixed Prosthetics and Removable Prosthetics. In these areas, the company offers dentists and dental technicians products and product systems that support them across the entire treatment and fabrication process and enable them to achieve esthetic results.

Research and development 
Ivoclar Vivadent AG has an internal Research and Development centre that employs more than 240 people who collaborate with various universities and scientific institutes

Training and continuing education 
The company operates a learning and training facility for dental courses and continuing professional education at its headquarters in Schaan called the International Centre for Dental Education (ICDE). Regional education centres in other countries around the world supplement the company's dental training programs.

References

External links 
Official Ivoclar Vivadent site
Family & Implant Dentistry

Medical technology companies of Liechtenstein
Schaan
Dental companies
Health care companies established in 1923
Brands of Liechtenstein
1923 establishments in Switzerland